Sigma Cassiopeiae (σ Cas, σ Cassiopeiae) is a binary star in the constellation Cassiopeia.

The primary component, σ Cassiopeiae A, is a B2 subgiant with an apparent magnitude of +5.0.  Its companion, σ Cassiopeiae B, is a B5 main sequence dwarf with an apparent magnitude of +7.1.  The two stars are three arcseconds apart.

Naming

References

Cassiopeiae, Sigma
Cassiopeiae, 08
Binary stars
B-type giants
B-type main-sequence stars
Cassiopeia (constellation)
9071
224572
118243
Durchmusterung objects
Beta Cephei variables
Suspected variables